Tu Majha Saangaati ( - you are my companion) is an Indian television soap opera on the Colors Marathi. It started airing on 11 July 2014 and airs Monday to Saturday. This program basically take view of Tukaram's life more from his wife's perspective.

Plot
The story is entirely based on the life of saint Tukaram and his wife Aavli. The first wife of Tukaram dies in child-birth. A heart-broken Tukaram is busy taking care of his children. Tukaram’s parents constantly ask him to get married a second time, but he refuses. Aavli is a vivacious small girl with full of life and joy. However, tradition forces her into a limited domestic life at her parents' house. The series tracks her transition from a young girl quick to anger to a mature and tolerant responsible woman. When Tukaram finally agrees to a second marriage, Aavli is the bride of choice. The series is an intriguing account of these two people coming together.

Cast
 Chinmay Mandlekar as Tukaram
 Mrunmayee Supal as child Aavli
 Rujuta Deshmukh as young Aavli
 Pramiti Narke as elder Aavli
 Shreevallabh Bhatt as Vaman
 Mangesh Desai as Goroba
 Apurva Nemlekar as Soyra

Reception

References

External links
 
 Tu Majha Saangaati at Voot

Marathi-language television shows
Colors Marathi original programming
2014 Indian television series debuts
2018 Indian television series endings